Plowright is an occupational surname based on plowwright, a maker of plows.

Charles Bagge Plowright (1849–1910), British doctor and mycologist
David Plowright (1930–2006), English television executive and producer
Hilda Plowright (1890–1973), English actress
Joan Plowright (born 1929), English actress and David Plowright's sister
John Plowright Houfton (1857–1929), British colliery owner and politician
Jonathan Plowright (born 1959), British concert pianist
Louise Plowright (1956–2016), British actress
Misty Plowright (born 1983), American politician
Rosalind Plowright (born 1949), English opera singer
Walter Plowright (1923–2010), English veterinary scientist

See also
Plowright Theatre, in Scunthorpe, North Lincolnshire named after Joan Plowright
Plowman (surname)

Occupational surnames